Keith Barr may refer to:

 Keith Barr (businessman) (born 1970), American businessman
 Keith Barr (Gaelic footballer) (born 1968), Gaelic footballer for Dublin
 Keith Barr (musician), British jazz musician who worked with Ken Moule
 Keith Barr (c. 1950 – 2010), American inventor and founder of Alesis